Andrew Miller may refer to:

Sports
Andrew Miller (baseball) (born 1985), baseball pitcher
Andrew Miller (cricketer, born 1963), cricketer for Oxford University and Middlesex
Andrew Miller (cricketer, born 1987), cricketer for Warwickshire
Andrew Miller (ice hockey) (born 1988), American ice hockey player
Andrew Miller (rugby union) (born 1972), New Zealand rugby union player
Andrew Miller (footballer) (1899–?), Scottish footballer
Andy Miller (rugby union) (born 1982), rugby player for Exeter Chiefs
Andy Miller (golfer) (born 1978), American golfer
Andy Miller (harness racing) (born 1968), American harness racing driver
Drew Miller (born 1984), American professional ice hockey player
Drew Miller (offensive lineman) (born 1985), American football center
Drew Miller (quarterback) (born 1978), American football quarterback
Mack Miller (1931–2020), American cross-country skier and trainer

Others
Andrew Miller (engraver) (died 1763), English mezzotint engraver
Andrew G. Miller (1801–1874), early judge of the United States District Court for the Eastern District of Wisconsin
Andrew Miller (actor) (born 1969), actor who portrayed the autistic savant Kazan in the 1997 film Cube
Andrew Miller (executive) (born 1966), CEO of the Guardian Media Group
Andrew Miller (Medal of Honor, 1864) (1836–c. 1866), American Civil War Medal of Honor recipient
Andrew Miller (Medal of Honor, 1944) (1916–1944), American World War II Medal of Honor recipient
Andrew Miller (musician), former drummer for American band This Will Destroy You
Andrew Miller (North Dakota judge) (1870–1960), North Dakota Attorney General and district court judge
Andrew Miller (novelist) (born 1960), author of Ingenious Pain, Oxygen and Pure
Andrew Miller (doctor), former president of the Australian Medical Association (WA)
Andrew Miller (physician), worked on H1N1
Andrew Miller (politician) (1949–2019), British Labour Party politician
Andrew Miller (publisher) (1857–1919), Life magazine publisher/owner, racehorse owner/breeder
Andrew Miller (Royal Navy officer) (1926–1986), senior Royal Navy officer
Andrew Miller (writer) (born 1974), author of The Earl of Petticoat Lane and Snowdrops
Andrew P. Miller (born 1932), attorney general of Virginia, 1970–1977
Andy Miller (musician) (born 1968), guitarist for the band Dodgy
Roy Andrew Miller (1924–2014), linguist, and proponent of the Altaic hypothesis
Andy Miller (businessman) (born 1968), American businessman and corporate executive
Andy Miller (writer), British writer, author of The Year of Reading Dangerously
Andy Miller (US writer), American writer, joint winner of 2007 Writers Guild of America Award for Dramatic Series
Andy Miller (record producer), Scottish record producer

See also
Andrew Millar (1705–1768), publisher